Paragonis grandiflora is a plant species, endemic to the southwest of Western Australia.

Taxonomy 
Paragonis grandiflora was described as Agonis grandiflora by George Bentham in 1867, and remained so until it was segregated in 2007 to a monotypic genus, Paragonis, by Judy Wheeler and Neville Marchant. Some sources continue to place it in Agonis.

Description 
A shrub, growing to a height around one metre, with many stems in an erect and open habit. Flowers are white to pink, appearing between July and August to November. The species occurs on a variety of gravel or stony soils and clays over granite or laterite.

References 

Rosids of Western Australia
Plants described in 2007
Plants described in 1867
Monotypic Myrtaceae genera
Endemic flora of Southwest Australia